TWA Flight 128 was a regularly scheduled Trans World Airlines passenger flight from Los Angeles to Boston, with intermediate stops in Cincinnati and Pittsburgh.  On November 20, 1967, Flight 128 crashed on final approach to Greater Cincinnati Airport; 70 of the 82 people aboard the Convair 880 were killed.

Aircraft and crew 
On November 20, 1967, TWA Flight 128 was operated using a Convair 880 narrow-body jet airliner (registration number N821TW). The Convair was manufactured in December 1960 and placed in service by TWA in January 1961. It had accumulated a total of 18,850 hours of operating time prior to the accident flight. While various maintenance writeups had occurred and been cleared in accordance with existing maintenance procedures, in no case were both the captain's and first officer's altimeters reported malfunctioning at the same time.

The flight's captain, 45-year-old Charles L. Cochran, had accumulated 12,895 hours of flight time, including 1,390 hours in the Convair 880. The first officer, 33-year-old Robert P. Moyers, had approximately 2,647 hours of flight time, including 447 in the Convair 880. The flight engineer, 29-year-old Jerry L. Roades, had 3,479 hours of piloting experience, none of which were in the Convair 880, but had 288 hours of experience as a flight engineer in the 880. The flight also had four flight attendants on board.

Accident 
Flight 128 departed Los Angeles at 17:37 Eastern Standard Time and operated to Cincinnati without incident. The flight was initially scheduled to make an Instrument Landing System approach to Greater Cincinnati Airport's runway 18 (now runway 18C). The outer marker beacon for runway 18 was operational, but the middle marker beacon, glide slope, and runway approach lights were inoperative.

At 20:56, Flight 128 reported passing the outer marker, and was cleared to land. The flight crew then initiated their descent and began performing their final landing checklist. The first impact was described by a survivor as like a hard landing; this was followed by a series of hard bumps and the airplane's final impact. The aircraft's final position was in a wooded area  short of the runway, where it disintegrated and was enveloped in flames.

Of the 82 people on board the aircraft, 60 were killed immediately, and another 10 died in the days following the crash.  Twelve people (two crew members and 10 passengers) survived with injuries. One of the surviving passengers reported that the plane broke apart in front of him, he stepped out and ran from the wreckage shortly before it exploded.

Aftermath 
The National Transportation Safety Board investigated the accident. NTSB investigators determined the likely cause of the accident to be crew error, in attempting a visual no-glide-slope approach at night during deteriorating weather conditions, without an adequate altimeter cross-reference.

The governor of Ohio, Jim Rhodes, requested runway 18 be closed.  After the runway reopened, high intensity lights were installed on the hillside along with glide-slope equipment beacons on recommendation of the National Transportation Safety Board.

See also
1961 Cincinnati Zantop DC-4 crash
American Airlines Flight 383, that crashed near Flight 128 site.

Notes

References 

 NTSB Report # AAR69-05
 NTSB brief DCA68A0002
 TWA Flight 128 Home Page

Aviation accidents and incidents in the United States in 1967
1967 in Kentucky
128
Airliner accidents and incidents in Kentucky
Airliner accidents and incidents caused by pilot error
Airliner accidents and incidents involving controlled flight into terrain
Accidents and incidents involving the Convair 880
November 1967 events in the United States
Cincinnati/Northern Kentucky International Airport